Georgi Cherkelov (Георги Черкелов); 25 June 1930 – 19 February 2012) was Bulgarian stage and film actor. One of the most prominent names in the Bulgarian theater and cinema in the last decades. He became widely popular after the role of the anti-communist police inspector Velinski in the TV series At Every Kilometer (1969). Cherkelov appeared in many of the major Bulgarian film productions. He played the leading roles in Men on a business trip (1969), Toplo / Warmth (1978), Socrates (1981), The Judge (1986). He was also in many German and Italian film co-productions. He has directed the TV film "Last Stop – Berlin" (1983).

Awards and public recognition
In 2001, Georgi Cherkelov was decorated with the highest government prize, the Order Of the Balkan Mountains, awarded to Bulgarian citizens with particularly great merit to Bulgaria. In 2009 he received the award Asker for lifetime achievement.

Biography and career
Born as Georgi Ivanov Cherkelov on 25 June 1930, in the city of Haskovo, Bulgaria, he initially began studying law at the Sofia University, where he remained for three years before transferring to the National Academy for Theater and Film ВИТИЗ Кръстьо Сарафов where he graduated in 1956. Cherkelov started his stage career in the Vratsa theater. His film debut was in the 1961 film The Last Round. During the fifty years of his career, he has appeared in more than 100 roles on stage and in about 70 films. While continuing to perform on the stage of the National Theater Ivan Vazov where he has worked for decades, Cherkelov was also the artistic director of the Ivan Radoev Dramatic Theatre in Pleven (1985–1990).

Georgi Cherkelov was one of the most prominent Shakespearean actors in Bulgaria, with memorable performances as King Lear, Richard II, Mercutio, Banco and many other major roles. He has played almost the entire repertoire of the British bard – a privilege many actors dream of, but only a few are given. Cherkelov's style was intelligent, with expressions based on subtle nuances, heavy pauses and solidly spoken phrases. His trademark were inborn dignity, loaded calm and incredible presence – unique personal characteristics of this great actor, which he infused into the characters he played.

In addition to being an extraordinary actor, Georgi Cherkelov has also staged a number of plays. Among the plays he directed are "One Flew Over the Cuckoo's Nest" (1982), "Wrestlers" (1981), "Huckleberry Finn" (1985), "Catcher in the Rye" (1998). Some of the adaptations for these plays he had written himself.  In 2010 his book "Stories and emails" was published by Locus Publishing.

He died on 19 February 2012.

Partial filmography

References

Sources

External links
 

Bulgarian male film actors
Bulgarian male stage actors
Bulgarian male television actors
People from Haskovo
1930 births
2012 deaths
20th-century Bulgarian male actors
21st-century Bulgarian male actors